Laurel Hill Coláiste FCJ, formerly known as Laurel Hill Convent, is an all-girls secondary school in Limerick, Ireland where all subjects are taught in Irish (gaelcholáiste).The school has around 400 students and has been ranked the top secondary school in Ireland for six years in a row.

History

The school was founded in the 1840s by Sisters Faithful Companions of Jesus (FCJ) and was known as Laurel Hill Convent. In 1935 the school switched to teaching all subjects in Irish when there was a push by the government to revive the Irish language through schools.

Academic results

For six years straight, 2014–2019, The Sunday Times Best Schools Guide ranked Laurel Hill Coláiste FCJ as the top secondary school in Ireland with 95.2% of its students going on to university.

Notable alumnae
 Neasa Hourigan, Green Party politician
 Detta O'Cathain, Baroness O'Cathain, Irish-born British life peer
 Dolores O'Riordan, lead singer of The Cranberries
 Kate O’Brien, writer

See also
 Education in the Republic of Ireland
 Gaeloideachas — Irish national organisation supporting the development of Irish-medium immersion schools

References

External links
 

Girls' schools in the Republic of Ireland
Education in Limerick (city)
Secondary schools in County Limerick
Catholic secondary schools in the Republic of Ireland
1840s establishments in Ireland
Educational institutions established in the 1840s